The 2018 Men's Hockey World Cup was the 14th edition of the Hockey World Cup, the quadrennial world championship for men's national field hockey teams organized by the FIH. It was held from 28 November to 16 December 2018, at the Kalinga Stadium in Bhubaneswar, India. The inauguration ceremony which was held on 27 November 2018, witnessed the biggest ever drone flying show in India.

Belgium won the tournament for the first time after defeating the Netherlands 3–2 in the final on a penalty shoot-out after a 0–0 draw. Defending champions Australia won the third place match by defeating England 8–1 in the third place playoff of the Odisha men's hockey world cup 2018.

Bidding

 
In March 2013, one month after the FIH published the event assignment process document for the 2014–2018 cycle, Australia, Belgium, India, Malaysia and New Zealand were shortlisted as candidates for hosting the event and were asked to submit bidding documentation, a requirement that Belgium did not meet. In addition, one month before the host election, Australia withdrew their application due to technical and financial reasons. India was announced as host on 7 November 2013, during a special ceremony in Lausanne, Switzerland.

Qualification
Due to the increase to 16 participating teams, the new qualification process was announced in July 2015 by the International Hockey Federation. Each of the continental champions from five confederations and the host nation received an automatic berth, and the 10/11 highest placed teams at the Semifinals of the 2016–17 FIH Hockey World League not already qualified would enter the tournament. The following sixteen teams shown with final pre-tournament rankings, competed in this tournament.

 – India qualified both as host and continental champion, therefore that quota was given to China as the highest-ranked team from the 2016–17 Hockey World League Semifinals not already qualified.

Format
The 16 teams were drawn into four groups, each containing four teams. Each team played each other team in its group once. The first-placed team in each group advanced to the quarter-finals, while the second- and third-placed teams in each group went into the crossover matches. From there on a single-elimination tournament was played.

Squads

Umpires
16 umpires were appointed by the FIH for this tournament.

Diego Barbas (ARG)
Dan Barstow (ENG)
Marcin Grochal (POL)
Ben Göntgen (GER)
Adam Kearns (AUS)
Eric Kim Lai Koh (MAS)
Lim Hong Zhen (SGP)
Martin Madden (SCO)
Raghu Prasad (IND)
Javed Shaikh (IND)
Simon Taylor (NZL)
David Tomlinson (NZL)
Gregory Uyttenhove (BEL)
Jonas van't Hek (NED)
Francisco Vásquez (ESP)
Peter Wright (RSA)

Opening Ceremony

Results
The schedule was published on 27 February 2018.

All times are local (UTC+5:30).

First round

Pool A

Pool B

Pool C

Pool D

Second round

Cross-overs

Quarter-finals

Semi-finals

Third place match

Final

Final ranking

Awards
The following awards were given at the conclusion of the tournament.

Goalscorers

References

External links
Official website

 
Men's Hockey World Cup
World Cup
International field hockey competitions hosted by India
Hockey World Cup Men
Hockey World Cup Men
Hockey World Cup Men
Sport in Bhubaneswar